Chloroclystis catastreptes, the green and brown carpet, is a moth in the family Geometridae. It was described by Edward Meyrick in 1891. It is found in Australia (Queensland, New South Wales, Victoria, Tasmania, South Australia and Western Australia).

Adults have a scalloped banded brown pattern on the wings.

References

External links

Moths described in 1891
catastreptes
Moths of Australia
Taxa named by Edward Meyrick